Arthur Donnell Long (born October 1, 1972) is an American former professional basketball player from Rochester, New York. A 6'9", 250 pound power forward out of the East High School and University of Cincinnati who also attended Independence Community Junior College, Dodge City Community College in Kansas and Southeastern Community College in Iowa, Long was not drafted but both the Portland Trail Blazers and Sacramento Kings signed him as a free agent in 1999, though he was waived before ever playing a game for either. He eventually played nine in games with the Kings from February 2001 until the season ended. He spent the majority of his college and pro career at power forward and center but as a high schooler, Long displayed the ability to put the ball on the floor and play small forward.

Long's NBA career lasted 98 games, and enjoyed his most successful year in the 2001-02 season, starting 27 of his 63 games with the Seattle SuperSonics. In 2002-03, he played 26 games (19 with the Philadelphia 76ers, 7 for the Toronto Raptors). He also played 3 preseason games for the Cleveland Cavaliers, but was waived prior to the 2004-05 season.

Long also played in France for ASVEL Lyon-Villeurbanne in 2000-01.

Notes

External links
Art Long Player Profile @ NBA.com
NBA stats @ basketballreference.com

1972 births
Living people
African-American basketball players
American expatriate basketball people in Argentina
American expatriate basketball people in Canada
American expatriate basketball people in France
American expatriate basketball people in Greece
American expatriate basketball people in Iran
American expatriate basketball people in Mexico
American expatriate basketball people in the Philippines
American expatriate basketball people in Turkey
American expatriate basketball people in Ukraine
American expatriate basketball people in Uruguay
American expatriate basketball people in Venezuela
American men's basketball players
American people convicted of drug offenses
American sportspeople convicted of crimes
ASVEL Basket players
Bandırma B.İ.K. players
Basketball players from New York (state)
Cincinnati Bearcats men's basketball players
Dodge City Conquistadors basketball players
Élan Béarnais players
Huntsville Flight players
Idaho Stampede (CBA) players
Ilysiakos B.C. players
Jeonju KCC Egis players
Philadelphia 76ers players
Philippine Basketball Association imports
Power forwards (basketball)
Sacramento Kings players
San Miguel Beermen players
Seattle SuperSonics players
Southeastern Blackhawks men's basketball players
Sportspeople from Rochester, New York
Toronto Raptors players
Trotamundos B.B.C. players
Undrafted National Basketball Association players
Yakama Sun Kings players
21st-century African-American sportspeople
20th-century African-American sportspeople